A Broken Leghorn is a 1959 Warner Bros. Looney Tunes cartoon short directed by Robert McKimson. The cartoon was released on September 26, 1959, and features Foghorn Leghorn and Miss Prissy. The voices are performed by Mel Blanc.

Plot
Foghorn Leghorn takes pity on Miss Prissy, whom the other hens are ridiculing because of her inability to lay an egg. To give her confidence, Foghorn slips one of the other hen's eggs under Miss Prissy as she is sitting on her nest. This garners surprise and some admiration as the other hens realize the egg has hatched a rooster chick. Foghorn overhears this fact and is immediately not pleased; there is, he believes, no need for the presence of another rooster "around here". Initially storming into the hen house to make his views known he is taken aback to see the hens standing - arms folded - as a united front.  Foghorn decides to "play it cagey" instead and feigns interest in "the cute little tyke".

The chick already has designs on Foghorn's job; the rooster realizes that "this kid's gotta go".  He approaches Miss Prissy and gains her permission to "train" her son in "the ancient art of roostering".  The rooster chick, however, has figured out Foghorn's plans for him.

Foghorn proceeds with attempts to get rid of his small rival, including: coaxing him to be a chicken crossing the road, hopefully into oncoming traffic; trying to get him to pull a cob of corn hard enough to activate the trigger of a rifle Foghorn tied it to. However, each of these attempts ends with Foghorn getting the worst of things.

Finally, Foghorn stomps towards the farm owner's house, intending to "have it out with the boss" and with the intended ultimatum, "One of us has gotta go!"  Upon entering, he is being driven away just as quickly as he entered. He is placed in a cage on the back of a truck, marked "Acme Poultry Co." Foghorn, somewhat bewildered by the unexpected turn of events, says "Well, I guess when you gotta go, you gotta go."

See also
 List of American films of 1959

References

External links

1959 films
1959 short films
1959 comedy films
1959 animated films
1950s American animated films
1950s animated short films
1950s English-language films
1950s Warner Bros. animated short films
American animated short films
Looney Tunes shorts
Foghorn Leghorn films
Films set on farms
Films set in 1959
Films directed by Robert McKimson
Films scored by Milt Franklyn
Warner Bros. Cartoons animated short films